The sculptor David McGary has created a standing statue of Chief Washakie, leader of the Shoshone people, in multiple versions, as well as an equestrian statue (titled Battle of Two Hearts) of the same subject.

Washington, D.C.
One bronze sculpture is installed in the United States Capitol Visitor Center's Emancipation Hall, in Washington, D.C., as part of the National Statuary Hall Collection. The statue was gifted by the U.S. state of Wyoming in 2000.

Wyoming

In Cheyenne, Wyoming, a statue of Washakie by McGary (a duplicate of the one in the U.S. Capitol) is at located at the Wyoming State Capitol in Cheyenne. This sculpture was installed in 2001.

Another statue is at Fort Washakie on the Wind River Indian Reservation, near Fort Washakie, Wyoming.

Another sculpture by McGary, a 24-foot sculpture entitled Battle of Two Hearts, executed in bronze, was installed at the University of Wyoming campus in Laramie, Wyoming in 2005. It depicted a mounted Washakie at the Battle of Crowheart Butte.

See also

 2000 in art
 Native Americans in popular culture

References

External links
 

2000 establishments in Washington, D.C.
2000 sculptures
Bronze sculptures in Washington, D.C.
Cheyenne, Wyoming
Fremont County, Wyoming
Monuments and memorials in Washington, D.C.
National Statuary Hall Collection
Outdoor sculptures in Wyoming
Sculptures of men in Washington, D.C.
Sculptures of men in Wyoming
Sculptures of Native Americans in Washington, D.C.
Statues in Wyoming
University of Wyoming